The First Roman–Dacian War took place from 101 to 102. The Kingdom of Dacia, under King Decebalus, had become a threat to the Roman Empire, and defeated several of Rome's armies during Domitian's reign (81–96).  The Emperor Trajan was set on ridding this threat to Rome's power and in 101 set out determined to defeat Dacia. After a year of heavy fighting, King Decebalus came to terms and accepted an unfavourable peace. When he broke these terms in 105, the Second Dacian War began.

The War
After support from the Roman Senate, by 101, Trajan was ready to advance on Dacia. The Roman offensive was spearheaded by two legionary columns, marching right to the heart of Dacia, burning towns and villages in the process. In 101, the Dacians led massive assaults on the Roman legions. In 102 Trajan moved his army down the Danube to Oescus. There the Roman armies converged for a final assault and defeated the Dacian army at the Battle of Tapae. After the battle, plus some additional conflicts, Trajan, worried by the upcoming cold winter, decided to make peace. The war, spanning months, had concluded with a peace treaty with harsh terms for Decebalus.

Aftermath
Once Dacia was secured, Decebalus received technical and military reinforcement from Trajan in order to create a powerful allied zone against the dangerous possible expeditions from the northern and eastern territories by the already moving migrator people. The resources were instead used to make the Dacian Kingdom a great independent power that would eventually rebel against Roman rule.

See also
 Trajan's Dacian Wars
 Second Dacian War
 Trajan
 Decebalus
 Second Battle of Tapae
 Trajan's Bridge

References
 Scarre, Chris, The Penguin Historical Atlas of Ancient Rome

Wars involving the Roman Empire
Wars involving Dacia
Trajan's Dacian Wars
101
102